A bifolium is a type of mathematical curve. It can also refer to:

Animals
 A genus of brachiopods

Plants
 Orchid genera now considered synonyms of Neottia
Bifolium Petiver ex Nieuwland
Bifolium P. G. Gaertner, B. Meyer et J. Scherbius
Bifolium cordatum, a synonym of Maianthemum bifolium
 A taxonomic section of the genus Larrea

Manuscripts
 A single sheet of parchment constituting two folios